Angel Families is a term used to politicize victims killed by undocumented immigrants in the United States.  President Donald Trump has invoked Angel Families to argue for his immigration policy, though some of the families have objected to the politicization of their loved one's death.

Trump began to spotlight the issue during his 2016 presidential campaign, a tactic that some media organizations compared to candidate Hillary Clinton's campaigning alongside Mothers of the Movement (a group founded in the wake of the death of Trayvon Martin to raise awareness about racial profiling), but has been accused of using bereavement to promote racism. 

On June 22, 2018, Trump hosted an event at the White House for Angel Families during which 14 relatives held 11 photos of deceased relatives who had been killed by undocumented immigrants who were criminally in the country as illegal aliens. Among those attending the event were Mary Ann Mendoza, mother of Sgt Brandon Mendoza; Laura Wilkerson, mother of Josh; Juan Piña, father of Christy Sue Piña; Steve Ronnebeck, father of Grant; and Michelle Root, mother of Sarah.

See also

 Illegal immigration to the United States and crime

References

Family
Political terminology of the United States